Virgin Radio Groove was a digital radio station in the UK, broadcasting on DAB and online and is a sister station to Virgin Radio UK.

History
The original Virgin Radio Groove operated between 2000 and 2008, playing motown, soul and disco music. At the end of 2019, Wireless Group, which had taken up the Virgin Radio brand in the UK from 2016, revived the Virgin Radio Groove name as a new digital station, broadcasting upbeat music to London in DAB+ and central Scotland as a stereo standard DAB. The station replaced regional variants of TalkSport on the Switchdigital multiplexes owned by Wireless. Like the existing Virgin Radio UK spin-offsVirgin Radio Chilled and Virgin Radio Anthemsthe station simulcasts the Chris Evans Breakfast Show, with its own programming at other times. Virgin Radio Groove officially began on 21 January 2020, with a 'takeover' stunt on the main station, the date chosen as it was the first anniversary of the launch of the Chris Evans Breakfast Show.

Presenters 
The station's launch line-up of presenters was confirmed by Mike Cassthe station's Content Directoras:
 Chris Brooks
 Steve Denyer
 Bam
 Rich Williams
 Gina McKie
 James Merritt
 Dave Kelly

References

External links

Radio stations established in 2020
Radio stations disestablished in 2022
Defunct radio stations in the United Kingdom
 
Wireless Group
2020 establishments in the United Kingdom
2022 disestablishments in the United Kingdom